The Walhalla Goldfields Railway is a  narrow gauge tourist railway located in the Thomson River and Stringers Creek valleys in Gippsland, Victoria, Australia, near the former gold-mining town and tourist destination of Walhalla.

History 

The Walhalla railway line was the last of four experimental narrow-gauge lines of the Victorian Railways, the Moe-Walhalla railway commenced in 1904, but was not completed until 1910. The railway was expected to be a boon for Walhalla, which was in a state of decline with gold mining operations becoming uneconomical. The largest gold mining company closed in 1914.

After the closure of the Walhalla mines, substantial timber traffic was carried from saw-mills around Erica until the late 1940s. Goods and passenger traffic declined, with the railway closed in sections from 1944 with the final section from Moe to Erica closed on 25 June 1954. The tracks and buildings were removed by 1960, leaving only the roadbed and a number of bridges.

The former station building at Walhalla was re-located to the Melbourne suburban station of Hartwell. The centre span of the National Estate listed Thomson River Railway Bridge was formerly part of a road bridge over the Murray River at Tocumwal.

Tourist attraction
The railway is a key tourist attraction for Walhalla today, carrying around 35,000 passengers each year. The trains run on Wednesdays, Saturdays and Sundays departing Walhalla at 11 am, 1 pm and 3 pm (with no 3 pm service from June to August), with increased daily services in school holiday periods.
The train journey begins departing the Walhalla Heritage Precinct, travelling through the station yard between Stringers Creek and the cliff-face that underpins the Brunton's Bridge Road. The first kilometre and a half is almost entirely built over six large trestle bridges that criss-cross Stringers Creek Gorge in an effort to find anchorage for each bridge abutment.

The train winds its way downhill across the historic Thomson River Bridge to arrive at Thomson Station. Visitors have time to explore the area or enjoy a picnic before returning to Walhalla.

Reopening
Recognising the untapped potential of the railway, there were several attempts to reopen the line for tourist traffic, although these proved unsuccessful until the early 1990s. One such project conducted during the 1970s was known as the Walhalla & Thomson River Steam Tramway; this project saw the construction of a brick station building (since demolished) and the acquisition of an ex-West Melbourne Gasworks steam locomotive, which is now in the possession of the Puffing Billy Railway and operated as locomotive no. 861 (Decauville). A small section of track was completed within the Walhalla station grounds and steam train rides were held, however the lack of funds to restore the Stringers Creek trestle bridges saw no further progress with reconstructing the track, and the project was abandoned by the early 1980s. The owner sold all the remaining railway assets in 1983.

The Walhalla Railway Taskforce formed in 1991, becoming the Walhalla Goldfields Railway, Inc., in 1993. The former roadbed was overgrown with blackberries and heavy scrub, with numerous sections of the trackbed collapsed and all the bridges either derelict or in ruinous condition. Restoration began with the establishment of Thomson Station and its accompanying yard on the site of the original station. The railway commenced operations in April 1994, within the Thomson station yard. Gradually the line progressed, first over the nationally-heritage-classified Thomson River Bridge in October 1994, pushing up the Stringers Creek Gorge to Happy Creek. This became the terminus until the six bridges in the last kilometre into the Walhalla Station yard were completed, and opened on 13 March 2002. The operating line is 4 km in length.

Due to bushfires in the nearby mountains, services on the railway were suspended as from the weekend of 9 December 2006. By 18 December 2006, fires reached the outskirts of Walhalla, and on 22 December 2006 fire destroyed the three-span trestle bridge ("bridge 7") adjacent to the former temporary terminus known as Cascade Bridge Halt.  Services resumed between Walhalla and Happy Creek on 31 December 2006.

On 10 March 2007, the Victorian State Government announced funding of $195,000 to rebuild the destroyed bridge and repair/upgrade the track. The bridge was completed in early April 2007 and normal operations between Thomson and Walhalla recommenced on Saturday 7 April.

In late 2014, the Walhalla station saw the addition of a verandah to complete the original appearance of the station. In more recent times, the WGR has adopted a much lower focus on heritage and its newer buildings (particularly at Thomson) are contemporary design and materials.

In November 2015, the Walhalla Goldfields Railway signed a twinning agreement with the Lynton and Barnstaple Railway in England. This agreement came about due to the similar nature of the railways and to foster cooperation and volunteer exchanges. Like the Walhalla Railway, the Lynton and Barnstaple was closed over 70 years ago and the work of restoration requires rebuilding the track bed and railway infrastructure.

Current operation and rollingstock
The Walhalla Goldfields Railway operates regular tourist services between Thomson and Walhalla stations, using diesel locomotives. Notably, the railway carries far more passengers as a tourist railway, than during its time as an operating revenue line. Around 30,000 passengers travel on the service each year, compared to around 1,000 annually during the latter years of the original railway's operation.

Due to the unavailability of original rolling stock from the railway (some of which has been preserved by the Puffing Billy Railway near Melbourne), locomotives were acquired from a variety of locations, including two small industrial diesel engines from the Gippsland area, a larger 10 class diesel engine from the Emu Bay Railway in Tasmania and in November 2010, a DH class diesel from Queensland Rail.

A small Henschel & Son steam locomotive built in Kassel, Germany was used between 2002–06 but was not commercially successful as it was underpowered and required a diesel locomotive banker on each service. It is now stored offsite by its owner. As part of the celebrations for the railway's centenary, the Puffing Billy Railway loaned steam locomotive 7A (which ran on the original line) for special public operations on the weekend of 29/30 May 2010. 7A is last believed to have operated through to Walhalla in 1936.

The buildings and new rollingstock designs reflect the original Victorian Railways design as much as possible.

While the railway did not use historical rolling stock at the time of reopening because all extant examples were owned and required by the Puffing Billy Railway, the collection is a significant piece of industrial railway history, and the WGR provides a valuable tourist train service for the regional economy.

In late 2015, the railway purchased two X1 class trams 461 and 463 for the purpose of conversion to rail-motors to allow 7 days-a-week operation with reduced crewing.

Locomotives

Future expansion plans
The WGR is planning to extend the line to Erica, where the railway's permanent workshop complex will be built.  Engineering assessments and a business plan have now been completed.

The first stage would extend through Platina to the site of O'Shea & Bennett's Siding at the junction of Boola Rd and the Walhalla Tourist Road. This section will require the reconstruction of two trestle bridges between Thomson and Platina, one of which has already been disassembled in preparation for this.

Completing the extension from O'Shea & Bennett's Siding to Erica will require the re-excavation of the former cutting where Boola Road crossed the railway on a bridge; from 1975, the cutting was used as a municipal garbage dump by the Narracan Shire Council, then entirely filled in and the road rebuilt across the top. There is also a large trestle bridge which requires reconstruction across Jacobs Creek, shortly before Erica station.

The Baw Baw Shire Council considered in late 2007 selling a large section of the Erica station site to the caravan park operators currently leasing the site, which would retain only an 18-metre-wide easement for the eventual reconstruction of the station by the Walhalla Goldfields Railway. The in principle decision was later revoked but the caravan park is rated by Baw Baw Shire as more important locally than a future tourist railway terminus.

In late 2015, the railway purchased X1 class trams 461 and 463 for the purpose of conversion to rail-motors to allow 7 days-a-week operation with reduced crewing.

Reconstruction of the line from Erica to Moe would likely be impractical and uneconomical, as the original right of way was sold in many places, and is partly covered by the waters of the Moondarra Reservoir.

Engineering heritage award 
The railway received an Engineering Heritage Marker from Engineers Australia as part of its Engineering Heritage Recognition Program.

References

Books

 Kiely, John and Savage, Russell, Steam on the Lens: Walhalla Railway Construction, the photographs of Wilf Henty; Vol.11, Russel Savage, Mildura, 2002,  (a second volume pictorial of the construction of the railway into Walhalla during 1908-1910. Images taken from large glass negatives)

External links

 Walhalla Goldfields Railway (official site)
 Gippsland's official tourism website - Walhalla Goldfields Railway

Tourist railways in Victoria (Australia)
2 ft 6 in gauge railways in Australia
Heritage railways in Australia
1910 establishments in Australia
1954 disestablishments in Australia
1994 establishments in Australia
Recipients of Engineers Australia engineering heritage markers
Transport in Gippsland (region)
Shire of Baw Baw
Walhalla railway line